Max Bögl is a German multinational major construction company based in Sengenthal, Germany.

Projects
The company has carried out several major projects in transport infrastructure, civil engineering and sport venues. It has also patented a new hybrid turbine wind tower. The company also developed the Transport System Bögl technology, a new kind of Maglev for medium speeds (up to 150 km/h) and distances of up to 30 km.

List

Germany
Munich, Stuttgart and Hamburg airports (new terminals)
parts of the Rhine–Main–Danube Canal
Cologne–Rhine/Main and Nuremberg–Ingolstadt ICE railway lines
EuroSpeedway Lausitz race track
Commerzbank Arena in Frankfurt (upgrade)
BayArena in Leverkusen (renovated)
Arena Nürnberger Versicherung
Arena Ulm/Neu-Ulm
Bundesautobahn 6 sector between Roth and Nuremberg

Croatia
Varaždin Arena

Poland
Stadion Miejski in Wrocław

Romania
National Arena in Bucharest
Sibiu Airport land strip
A1 motorway segments Sibiu bypass and Arad – Nădlac (both in a joint venture with Astaldi)
A2 motorway segment between Drajna and Feteşti, and the sector between Cernavodă and Constanţa (both in a joint venture with Astaldi)
A3 motorway segment between Iernut and Cheţani - currently under construction (in a joint venture with Astaldi)

United Arab Emirates
Al Maktoum International Airport in Dubai

References
Inline

General

Companies based in Bavaria
Construction and civil engineering companies established in 1929
Construction and civil engineering companies of Germany
Multinational companies headquartered in Germany
German brands
German companies established in 1929